Clarence Jacob Answerth (27 May 1901 – 28 May 1981) was an Australian rules footballer who played with Hawthorn in the Victorian Football League (VFL).

Notes

External links 

1901 births
1981 deaths
Australian rules footballers from Victoria (Australia)
Hawthorn Football Club players